Jean Lèques (31 August 1931 – 1 June 2022) was a New Caledonian politician.  He served as mayor of Nouméa from 1986 to 2014; between 1999 and 2001 he was the first sitting president of the government of New Caledonia under the Organic Law no. 99-209.

References

1931 births
2022 deaths
Mayors of Nouméa
Presidents of the Government of New Caledonia
Members of the Congress of New Caledonia
Mayors of places in New Caledonia
The Rally (New Caledonia) politicians
Grand Officiers of the Légion d'honneur
Knights Commander of the Order of St Gregory the Great
Officers of the Ordre national du Mérite
Chevaliers of the Ordre des Palmes Académiques
People from Nouméa